Anne's Church is named in honour of Anne of Denmark, Electress of Saxony. The original 1578 church was destroyed by Prussian troops in 1760 during the Seven Years' War. The new church was opened in 1769.

Dresden AnnesChurch
Dresden AnnesChurch
Annenkirche
Annenkirche
Dresden AnnesChurch
Dresden Anne
Dresden Anne